Wolfgang Lischke (born 4 July 1947) is a German football player and coach.

During 1969–1980 he played in clubs of DDR-Oberliga ("GDR Premier League"). After the reunification of Germany he was coach for SG LVB (:de:Sportgemeinschaft Leipziger Verkehrsbetriebe).

Player
07/1968–06/1969 : BSG Chemie Zeitz
1969–1972: BSG Stahl Riesa
1972–1973: SG Dynamo Dresden
1973–1980: BSG Chemie Leipzig
07/1982–06/1984: TSG Chemie Markkleeberg

Coach/manager

07/2009–06/2010 Blau-Weiß Großlehna
 06/2008–03/2009 SG Rotation Leipzig
 07/2007–06/2008 SG LVB Leipzig

References

1947 births
German footballers
East German footballers
Dynamo Dresden players
German football managers
Living people
DDR-Oberliga players
German footballers needing infoboxes
Association football forwards